Iraniella is a fungal genus in the class Sordariomycetes. The relationship of this taxon to other taxa within the class is unknown (incertae sedis). The genus contains the single species Iraniella rechingeri.

References

Sordariomycetes enigmatic taxa
Monotypic Sordariomycetes genera